Behind the Curtain is a compilation album by English rock band Wire. It was released in 1995, composed of outtakes and early versions of songs from 1977–1978. The first six songs on the compilation come from the band's performance at The Roxy in London in April 1977 which was their first performance as a four-piece without George Gil on guitar. The other twenty-five songs come from demos Wire made for their first three albums and include both songs that were rerecorded for those albums or for singles released in that time period and songs that were previously unreleased. The full demo sessions have since been released in 2018 on the special editions of the first three albums.
The song "Stablemate" appears as "Stalemate" on the special edition of Chairs Missing.

Track listing

Personnel 

 Production

 Tim Chacksfield – project co-ordination
 Kevin S. Eden – compilation, liner notes
 Bruce Gilbert – concept
 Graham Lewis – concept
 Jon Savage – compilation, liner notes
 Mike Thorne – producer
 Jon Wozencroft – compilation, liner notes, design

References

External links 

 

Wire (band) compilation albums
1995 compilation albums
EMI Records compilation albums
Albums produced by Mike Thorne